Dimitri Karbanenko (born 19 July 1973) is a former Soviet, French male artistic gymnast, representing his nation at international competitions.  He participated at the 2000 Summer Olympics, 2004 Summer Olympics and 2008 Summer Olympics. He also competed at world championships, including the 2003 World Artistic Gymnastics Championships, 2006 World Artistic Gymnastics Championships and 2007 World Artistic Gymnastics Championships

References

External links 
 
 
 
 

1973 births
Living people
French male artistic gymnasts
Place of birth missing (living people)
Gymnasts at the 2000 Summer Olympics
Gymnasts at the 2004 Summer Olympics
Gymnasts at the 2008 Summer Olympics
Olympic gymnasts of France
Mediterranean Games gold medalists for France
Mediterranean Games medalists in gymnastics
Competitors at the 2001 Mediterranean Games